Shine Lawyers is an Australian law firm specialising in personal injury compensation law, operating on a no win no fee basis. The firm has expanded into providing professional negligence, coal seam gas and aviation law legal services through a number of acquisitions. The firm is commonly associated with its spokesperson, Erin Brockovich.

Founded in Toowoomba in 1976, the firm is now headquartered in Brisbane, Australia, and currently has over 700 employees based across more than 40 offices across Australia and New Zealand.

History
Shine Lawyers was founded in 1976 (then known as KG Shine & Co) by Kerry Shine, an Australian Labor Party politician who was member of the Legislative Assembly from 2001 to 2012 and Attorney-General of Queensland from 2006 to 2009. It was rebranded as Shine Lawyers in 2006, under then managing partner Stephen Roche and current managing director Simon Morrison. It was one of the first law firms in the world to list on the ASX, in May 2013.

Acquisitions and mergers
Since 1976 Shine Lawyers has acquired and integrated more than 20 other legal firms. The firm has revealed plans to move into the UK legal market as part of an international acquisition strategy.

Notable current and past cases
Since 1976, Shine Lawyers have handled some difficult and widely publicised cases that have come before Australian Courts.
In 2001, Shine Lawyers represented a woman who had suffered abuse as a student at Toowoomba Preparatory School. The civil court decision awarded a record payout to the victim, and a subsequent inquiry led to the resignation of the governor-general Peter Hollingworth.
Notable personal injury cases include the car accident compensation case for Ray and Marion Whitley, the medical negligence compensation case for Zac Ward and the workers compensation case for Steven Reynolds.

Notable class actions
On 27 September 2011, Shine Lawyers commenced a class action against DePuy International Ltd and Johnson & Johnson on behalf of Australians affected by faulty DePuy ASR hip implants. It is alleged that the DePuy ASR hip implants were defective, not fit for their intended purpose and/or not of merchantable quality, in contravention of provisions of the Trade Practices Act 1974 (Cth).
On 16 October 2012, Shine Lawyers commenced a class action against Johnson & Johnson and Ethicon on behalf of Australians suffering complications as a result of faulty prolapse mesh implants. In March 2020, the Federal Court decided in favour of the three lead applicants, awarding them $2.6 million in damages. Johnson & Johnson’s appeal was dismissed in March 2021. On the 5th of November 2021, the High Court of Australia dismissed Johnson & Johnson’s application for special leave to appeal.

Notable employees
Erin Brockovich consults with Shine Lawyers and assists the firm with environmental cases and class actions. She has also featured in a number of advertising campaigns employed by the firm.

Notes and references 

Law firms of Australia
Companies listed on the Australian Securities Exchange
Law firms established in 1976
1976 establishments in Australia